The Healing Trust is a non-profit foundation in Nashville, Tennessee, which provides grants to non-profits that provide healthcare access to vulnerable people in Tennessee.

Until 2008, the Trust was required to grant the majority of its investment income to the Baptist Hospital. The remainder of the investment income was given via grants to non-profit organizations in middle Tennessee providing healthcare access to vulnerable populations. Established in 2002 out of the proceeds of the sale of the Baptist Hospital system to Ascension Health, the Trust has awarded more than $60 million in grants during its first ten years of operation.   

The Trust is an independent private foundation and was not affiliated with Baptist Hospital or the Baptist Hospital Foundation.

External links
Baptist Healing Trust

Christian organizations established in 2002
Baptist organizations established in the 21st century
2002 establishments in Tennessee